The 61st British Academy Television Awards nominations were announced on 8 April 2015.

Winners and nominees

Winners are listed first and emboldened.

Programmes with multiple nominations

Most major wins

In Memoriam

Donald Sinden
Brian Clemens
Lance Percival
Geraldine McEwan
Francis Matthews
Joan Rivers
Zohra Sehgal
Julian Wilson
Lynda Bellingham
David Lomax
Keith Harris
Mike Smith
Jeremy Lloyd
Sam Kelly
Rebekah Gibbs
Terry Pratchett
Leonard Nimoy
John Bardon
Alan Howard
James Garner
Richie Benaud
Warren Clarke
Ross Burden
Anne Kirkbride
Shaw Taylor
Rik Mayall

See also
 British Academy Television Awards
 BAFTA Scotland
 BAFTA Cymru

References

External links
Official site at BAFTA.org

British Academy Television Awards
British Academy Television Awards
British Academy Television Awards, 2015
Annual television shows
British Academy Television Awards
British Academy Television Awards